Montagnes may refer to:

France
Communes:
 Ferrals-les-Montagnes, in the Hérault Department
 Riom-ès-Montagnes, in the Cantal Department
 Saint-Affrique-les-Montagnes, in the Tarn Department
 Viviers-lès-Montagnes, in the Tarn Department

Ivory Coast
 Montagnes District, a first-level administrative subdivision
 Dix-Huit Montagnes Region, a defunct first-level administrative subdivision

See also

 Montagne (disambiguation)
 La Montagne (disambiguation)